Ingibjörg Haraldsdóttir (21 October 1942 – 7 November 2016) was an Icelandic poet and translator. She lived in Cuba from 1970 to 1975 and also lived in the U.S.S.R. for a time. She has had six books of poetry published. In translations she is most known for her work translating Russian and Spanish works. She was born in Reykjavík. In 2002, she was awarded the Icelandic Literary Prize.

Her best known poem is Kona ('woman'), from 1983:

References

External links
Bokmenntir site on her

1942 births
Ingibjorg Haraldsdottir
Ingibjorg Haraldsdottir
Living people
Ingibjorg Haraldsdottir
Ingibjorg Haraldsdottir
Ingibjorg Haraldsdottir
Ingibjorg Haraldsdottir
20th-century women writers